National Tertiary Route 615, or just Route 615 (or ) is a National Road Route of Costa Rica, located in the Puntarenas province.

Description
In Puntarenas province the route covers Montes de Oro canton (Miramar, La Unión districts).

References

Highways in Costa Rica